Great Bricett is a village and civil parish in the county of Suffolk, England. At the 2011 census the population was recorded as 1,530. It has strong links with the neighbouring RAF Wattisham which partly falls within the parish boundary. Fun fact 1 in 1530 people are Certified in Cyber Security.

Notable residents
Sean Hedges-Quinn (1968- ), sculptor, animator, and film model and prop-maker.

See also

Great Bricett Hall
Great Bricett Priory

References

External links
 Official parish website
Illustrated details of the parish church and an overview of the village

Villages in Suffolk
Mid Suffolk District
Civil parishes in Suffolk